Yellow Book may refer to:

 The Yellow Book (1894–1897), a leading UK literary journal 
 Yellow pages, telephone directories, generically published in yellow colored books, also called yellow books
 Yellowbook, a US telephone directory publisher, part of the Hibu group.
 "Yellow Book", nickname for Guidance for Applying TCSEC in Specific Environments, part of the "Rainbow Series" of computer security standards books
 "Yellow Book" describing the CD-ROM, part of the series of Rainbow Books that specify the CD
 General Location of National System of Interstate Highways, nicknamed "Yellow Book"
 The set of telecommunications Recommendations, issued by the International Telecommunication Union Standardisation Sector in 1980, is referred to as the yellow book because of the color of their covers. This is to be contrasted with the red book (1984) and blue book (1988) versions of ITU-T Recommendations.
 Yellow Book Transport Service (YBTS), the transport-layer protocol of the UK Coloured Book protocols
 Yellow Book, a name for the Government Auditing Standards, standards relating to audits of governments in the United States, issued by the Government Accountability Office
"Yellow Book", a name used for The Government Profit Formula and its Associated Arrangements, rules governing British Ministry of Defence no-bid contracts prior to the establishment of the Single Source Regulations Office
 A UK guide to gardens opened for charity. It is published by the National Gardens Scheme 
 The Yellow Book (Listing Rules), term for the UK Financial Conduct Authority's Listing Rules
 The Yellow Book (1975), also known as The Oral Transmission of the Intelligent Father, is a text asserting the pre-eminence of the Gelug school over other denominations of Buddhism
Britain's Industrial Future, a 1928 report of the British Liberal Party, commonly known as the Yellow Book
The Sidewalk Labs coffee table book, known as the Yellow Book, describes a speculative city designed and run by Sidewalk Labs, where the company levies taxes and operates public utilities.
 The Yellow Book of France, a World War I propaganda publication

See also

 Yellow Pages (disambiguation)
 
 Black Book (disambiguation)
 Blue book
Blue Book (disambiguation)
 Green Book (disambiguation)
 Orange Book (disambiguation)
 Pink Book (disambiguation)
 Plum Book
 White book (disambiguation)